Malaybalay Airport, also known as Malaybalay Airstrip, was the airport that used to serve general aviation in the area of Malaybalay, the capital city of Bukidnon in the Philippines. During the late 1990s, the airport was closed down and the area where the airport used to be located was converted into a low-cost housing project by the provincial government of Bukidnon.

References

Defunct airports in the Philippines
Malaybalay
Buildings and structures in Bukidnon
Transportation in Mindanao